The 2011 Munster Senior Hurling Championship Final was a hurling match played on 10 July 2011 at Páirc Uí Chaoimh, Cork. It was contested by Tipperary and Waterford. The match pitted the 2010 All-Ireland Hurling Champions against the 2010 Munster Hurling Champions. For the first time ever, both Waterford's Senior and Minor hurling teams were making their third Munster Final appearance in a row. It was the first time the two teams had met in a Munster Senior Hurling Championship Final at Páirc Uí Chaoimh since the 2002 Munster Senior Hurling Championship Final.

Tipperary won the game by a margin of 21 points to claim their third Munster title in four years.  It was the largest winning margin in a Munster Final since the 1982 decider between Cork and Waterford, and the first time since 1936 that one team managed to score at least 7 goals.

Previous Munster Final encounters

Team selection
Waterford manager Davy Fitzgerald made three changes to the team that overcame Limerick in the semi-final with Jerome Maher picked at full-back and making his Championship debut.
Tipperary made one change to their team to the team that defeated Clare in the semi-final with Paddy Stapleton coming into the team in place of David Young at right corner-back.

Match details

References

External links
 2011 Munster Senior Hurling Championship Final at Hurling Stats
 2011 Munster Senior Hurling Championship Final as it happened

Munster
Munster Senior Hurling Championship Finals
Tipperary GAA matches
Waterford GAA matches